The Bahamas Ministry of Tourism, Investment and Aviation is a government agency of The Bahamas. Its head office is at the Bolam House in Nassau. The agency has other offices in New Providence.

References

External links

 Ministry of Tourism & Aviation

Bahamas
Tourism
Tourism ministries
Transport organisations based in the Bahamas